II (also called Sahg II) is the second studio album by the Norwegian hard rock band Sahg, released on March 18, 2008, under the Swedish record label Regain Records.
 
The album was recorded as a trio after the departure of original drummer Kvitrafn some months before. Instead, the producer Brynjulv Guddal was the session drummer. Similarly, it features several guest vocalists in "From Conscious Sleep".

A music video was made for "Pyromancer", directed by Asle Birkeland.

Track listing

Personnel

Sahg 
Olav Iversen – Vocals, Guitars, Percussion, Mandola (Track 5)
Thomas Tofthagen – Guitars
King – Bass

Guest/session musicians 
Brynjulv Guddal – Drums, Percussion, Keyboards, Piano, Hammond organ
Torkjell Rød, Per Vidar Staff, Marita Moe Sandven, Lindy Fay Hella, Elise Heradstveit Schei – Vocals (choirs) (Track 3)

Production and engineering 
Martin Kvamme – Cover art
Thor Brødreskift – Photography
Brynjulv Guddal – Producer, Engineering
Rob Caggiano – Mixing, Mastering
Paul Orofino – Mixing, Mastering
Mixed and mastered in Millbrook Sound Studio, Millbrook, New York

References

External links 
Discogs.com
Metallum Archvies

2008 albums
Sahg albums
Regain Records albums